Moses Melchior (28 January 1825 – 25 November 1912) was a Jewish Danish businessman. He was a co-owner of Moses & Søn G. Melchior, a trading house founded by his grandfather.

Early life and education
Melchior was born into a wealthy Jewish family in Copenhagen, the son of Gerson Moses Melchior (1771–1845) by his second wife Birgitte (Jette) Melchior née Israel (1792–1855). His father was second generation in the trading house Moses & Søn G. Melchior. He received a commercial education in Jacob Holm & Sønner.

Career
Moses Melchior's elder brother Moritz G. Melchior became the sole owner of Moses & Søn G. Melchior when their father died in 1845. Moses Melchior joined him as a partner in 1850. After Moritz G. Melchior's death in 1884, Moses Melchior took over the management of the company in collaboration with his nephew Carl Henriques Melchior.

Public life and charity
Melchior was a member of the Copenhagen City Council from 1869 to 1984. He was a member of the Maritime and Commercial Court from 1883 to 1905 and of 's committee from 1885 to 1904.

He was also active in a number of Jewish associations and organisations.

He was also active in a number of charities. He founded Henriette Melchiors Stiftelse with affordable accommodation for widows of artists and scientists, naming it after his sister Henriette Melchior (–1902).

Personal life and legacy
 
Moses Melchior remained unmarried and had no children. As part of the Melchior family, Moses Melchior was a close friend of the writer Hans Christian Andersen. He participated in the celebration of his 65 years birthday. Melchior died on 25 November 1912 and is buried in the Jewish Northern Cemetery in Copenhagen.

The memorial is from 1916 and was created by Ludvig Brandstrup.

He is seen in Laurits Tuxen's oil painting  (1906).

References

19th-century Danish businesspeople
19th-century Copenhagen City Council members
Burials at Jewish Northern Cemetery (Copenhagen)
Businesspeople from Copenhagen
Danish Jews
1825 births
1912 deaths